This is a list of seasons played by Hapoel Rishon LeZion Football Club in Israeli and European football, from 1936–37 (when the club first competed in the Cup) to the most recent completed season. It details the club's achievements in major competitions, and the top scorers for each season. Top scorers in bold were also the top scorers in the Israeli league that season. Records of minor competitions such as the Lilian Cup are not included due to them being considered of less importance than the State Cup and the Toto Cup.

History
The club was established in 1929 and won the promotion play-offs to the top division at the end of the 1940 season, ahead of the 1941–42 season. The club stayed at the top division until the end of the 1951–52 season, after which the club mainly played in the second division, returning to the top division for three seasons in the late 1970s and 9 more seasons, starting from 1994–95 season. The club reached the cup final in 1996, losing to Maccabi Tel Aviv. As Maccabi Tel Aviv won the double, The club qualified to UEFA Cup Winners' Cup, but was eliminated in the qualifying round by Constructorul Chisinau of Moldova on away goals rule (0:1, 3:2).

Seasons

Key

 P = Played
 W = Games won
 D = Games drawn
 L = Games lost
 F = Goals for
 A = Goals against
 Pts = Points
 Pos = Final position

 Leumit = Liga Leumit (National League)
 Artzit = Liga Artzit (Nationwide League)
 Premier = Liga Al (Premier League)
 Pal. League = Palestine League

 F = Final
 Group = Group stage
 QF = Quarter-finals
 QR1 = First Qualifying Round
 QR2 = Second Qualifying Round
 QR3 = Third Qualifying Round
 QR4 = Fourth Qualifying Round
 RInt = Intermediate Round

 R1 = Round 1
 R2 = Round 2
 R3 = Round 3
 R4 = Round 4
 R5 = Round 5
 R6 = Round 6
 SF = Semi-finals

Notes

References

Hapoel Rishon LeZion F.C.
 
Hapoel Rishon LeZion